Ron Knapp was the CEO of the Australian Aluminium Council from 2002 to 2008, having previously led the World Coal Institute. In December 2008 he became Secretary-General of the International Aluminium Institute.

References 

Living people
Australian chief executives
Year of birth missing (living people)
Place of birth missing (living people)